Samuel W. Pennypacker School is a historic elementary school located in the West Oak Lane neighborhood of Philadelphia, Pennsylvania. It is a part of the School District of Philadelphia.

It was designed by Irwin T. Catharine and built in 1929–1930.  It is a three-story, eight bay, brick building on a raised basement in a Late Gothic Revival-style.  It features brick piers with terra cotta capitals, a projecting stone two-story bay, and four small towers at each corner.  It was named for Pennsylvania Governor Samuel W. Pennypacker (1843-1916).

It was added to the National Register of Historic Places in 1988.

Feeder patterns
Pennypacker feeds into King High School.

References

External links
 Samuel W. Pennypacker School
 

School buildings on the National Register of Historic Places in Philadelphia
Gothic Revival architecture in Pennsylvania
School buildings completed in 1930
West Oak Lane, Philadelphia
Public elementary schools in Philadelphia
School District of Philadelphia
1930 establishments in Pennsylvania